The members of the 42nd General Assembly of Newfoundland were elected in the Newfoundland general election held in May 1993. The general assembly sat from May 20, 1993 to January 29, 1996.

The Liberal Party led by Clyde Wells formed the government.

Paul Dicks served as speaker until 1995. Lloyd Snow succeeded Dicks as speaker.

There were three sessions of the 42nd General Assembly:

Frederick Russell served as lieutenant governor of Newfoundland.

Members of the Assembly 
The following members were elected to the assembly in 1993:

Notes:

By-elections 
By-elections were held to replace members for various reasons:

Notes:

References 

Terms of the General Assembly of Newfoundland and Labrador